The US Post Office-Johnstown is a historic post office building located at 14 North William Street in  Johnstown, Fulton County, New York. It was designed and built in 1912–1913, and is one of a number of post offices in New York State designed by the Office of the Supervising Architect of the Treasury Department, James Knox Taylor.  It was enlarged in 1965–1966.  The original section is a five-by-seven-bay, 1-story limestone structure on a granite foundation in the Classical Revival style.  The entrance portico features four Doric order columns supporting an entablature.  The building also features semi-circular arched windows.

It was listed on the National Register of Historic Places in 1989.

References

External links

Johnstown
Neoclassical architecture in New York (state)
Government buildings completed in 1913
Buildings and structures in Fulton County, New York
1913 establishments in New York (state)
National Register of Historic Places in Fulton County, New York